George Sharp (born 12 March 1950) is an English former first-class cricketer and umpire. He was born at West Hartlepool, County Durham.

Playing career
Sharp spent 17 years at Northamptonshire and played more than 300 games, as a wicketkeeper batsman.

Umpiring career
Sharp umpired 15 Tests and 31 One Day Internationals. He umpired over 300 matches in First-class and List A cricket. Sharp continued to umpire matches in England until 2015, when he turned 65. ECB policy requires all umpires to retire when they reach this age, in order to allow younger umpires to gain employment. Sharp and fellow Northamptonshire team-mate and umpire Peter Willey challenged this decision at an employment tribunal, alleging age discrimination on the part of the ECB, but lost their case.

See also
 List of Test cricket umpires
 List of One Day International cricket umpires

References

External links
 

1950 births
Living people
English Test cricket umpires
English One Day International cricket umpires
English cricketers
Northamptonshire cricketers
People from West Hartlepool
Cricketers from County Durham
Sportspeople from Hartlepool
T. N. Pearce's XI cricketers
Wicket-keepers